WEC may stand for:

Organizations
 Westinghouse Electric Company, a multinational company supplying nuclear services, fuel, and power plants
 Wisconsin Elections Commission, an agency that enforces election laws in Wisconsin
 Wisconsin Energy Corporation, a ticker symbol
 Wireless Experimental Centre, a British wartime codebreaking establishment in Delhi, India
 World Energy Council, a multi-energy international organisation
 WEC International, an international Christian mission agency
 Women's Emergency Committee to Open Our Schools, a political action group formed in response to the Little Rock Integration Crisis school closings

Sports
 World Enduro Championship, the motorcycle sport world championship
 FIA World Endurance Championship, the FIA sanctioned championship for sports car racing
 World Extreme Cagefighting, a defunct mixed martial arts organization in the US
 Wellness and Events Center, an athletics building on the campus of New Jersey Institute of Technology (NJIT)

Education
 Wilmington Enterprise College, Wilmington, Dartford, UK
 Wah Engineering College, Wah Cantt, Punjab, Pakistan

Other
 Whole Earth Catalog, a former American counterculture magazine and product catalog
 WIN Entertainment Centre , Wollongong, Australia
 World Economic Consortium (Crusader), the fictional, world government in the Crusader series of games
 WEC Le Mans, a 1986 racing arcade game by Konami
 Wind Energy Converter, a wind turbine
 Wave Energy Converter, a type of renewable energy device